Alopochen is a genus of the bird family Anatidae, part of the subfamily Tadorninae along with the shelducks. It contains one extant species, the Egyptian goose (Alopochen aegyptiaca), and two or three species which became extinct in the last 1,000 years or so. The Egyptian goose is native to mainland Africa, and the extinct species are from Madagascar and the Mascarene Islands.

mtDNA cytochrome b sequence data suggest that the relationships of Alopochen to Tadorna need further investigation.

Species

 Egyptian goose (Alopochen aegyptiaca)

The extinct species of the genus are:
 Malagasy shelduck or Madagascar shelduck (Alopochen sirabensis) (Andrews 1897) (may be a subspecies of A. mauritiana) – Madagascar, prehistoric: see Late Quaternary prehistoric birds
 Mauritius sheldgoose (Alopochen mauritiana) (Newton & Gadow 1893)– Mauritius, late 1690s
 Réunion sheldgoose or Kervazo's Egyptian goose (Alopochen kervazoi) (Cowles 1994) Mourer-Chauviré et al. 1999– Réunion, circa 1690s
 Alopochen tarabukini (Kuročkin & Ganea) Mlíkovský 2002

The generic name looks like Greek ἀλώπηξ + χήν = "fox-goose", referring to the colour of its back, but with a Greek language error; the linguistically correct form would have been *Alopecchen or *Alopecochen.

References 

 
Bird genera
Bird genera with one living species
Taxa named by Leonhard Stejneger